The 1961 Scotch Cup was the third edition of the men's World Curling Championship. It was held across four venues: Ayr, Kirkcaldy, Perth and Edinburgh, Scotland. The tournament began with games in Ayr on 21 March. The second and third days were on 22 and 23 March in Kirkcaldy, and the fourth day was in Perth on 24 March.

The tournament was expanded to a three team competition with the United States debuting in the tournament. After the three teams ended up tied with a 2-2 win–loss record, a playoff was played with the semi-final played on 25 March in Perth and the final played in Edinburgh on 30 March. In the final, Canada won the Scotch Cup for the third time with a 12-7 win over Scotland in the final.

Teams

Standings

Results

Draw 1

Draw 2
At Ayr Curling Rink.

Draw 3

Draw 4
23 March, Kirkcaldy

Draw 5

Draw 6

Playoffs

Semi final

Final

References

External links

World Men's Curling Championship
Scotch Cup, 1961
International curling competitions hosted by Scotland
Scotch Cup, 1961
Sport in Ayr
International sports competitions in Edinburgh
Kirkcaldy
Sport in Perth, Scotland
Scotch Cup
1960s in Edinburgh